The Dark Side of the Moon is a 1990 direct-to-video science fiction horror film. It was directed by D. J. Webster from the screenplay by brothers Chad and Carey Hayes.

Plot
In the near future, a maintenance vehicle is orbiting the Earth on a mission to repair nuclear-armed satellites. Suddenly, the crew experiences a mysterious, inexplicable power failure that cannot be accounted for. As the ship grows colder, they find themselves drifting toward the dark side of the Moon. An old NASA shuttle, the Discovery, drifts toward them, although NASA has not been operating for 30 years.

Two of the crew members board the ship, hoping to salvage parts to repair their ship, but instead they find a dead body. The mission records of the crew's own ship indicate that the shuttle they have found disappeared in the Bermuda Triangle many years before. The area in space the shuttle is found in corresponds to the earthbound Bermuda Triangle.

As they attempt to solve this mystery, it quickly becomes apparent that a malevolent force has been waiting on the NASA shuttle, using the aforesaid dead body as its host. It now begins to stalk the crew members one at a time. As they fight the force, it becomes apparent they are facing the devil.

With time, air and power running out, the captain decides to make the ultimate sacrifice.

Cast
Robert Sampson as Flynn Harding
Will Bledsoe as Giles Stewart
Joe Turkel as Paxton Warner
Camilla More as Lesli
John Diehl as Philip Jennings
Wendy MacDonald as Alex McInny
Alan Blumenfeld as Dreyfus Steiner

Release
The film was released on VHS by Vidmark Entertainment on May 30, 1990.

Reception
Creature Feature gave the movie 3.5 out of 5 stars, finding the movie intriguing, taut and well made.

References

External links

1990 direct-to-video films
1990 films
1990 horror films
American direct-to-video films
American science fiction horror films
Films about astronauts
Films set in 2022
Moon in film
1990s science fiction horror films
1990s English-language films
1990s American films